Flămânzi is a town in Botoșani County, Western Moldavia, Romania. It administers five villages: Chițoveni, Flămânzi (a village distinct from the town), Nicolae Bălcescu, Poiana, and Prisăcani.

Natives 
 Mihai Bordeianu, footballer
 Trifan Roman Grosu, peasant revolter

References 

Populated places in Botoșani County
Localities in Western Moldavia
Towns in Romania